This list of ancient Egyptian papyri includes some of the better known individual papyri written in hieroglyphs, hieratic, demotic or in Greek. Excluded are papyri found abroad or containing Biblical texts which are listed in separate lists.

The content descriptions are preceded by a letter in bold font, indicating the literary genre it belongs to. In the case of collections of texts of various kinds, the first letter refers to the most important text on the papyrus.
B : biographical
D : drawings: cartoons, maps
F : funerary: Books of the Dead
L : literary texts: tales, poems
O : official records
P : private papyri, correspondence, contracts
R : religious, myths
S : scientific: mathematical, medical
T : teachings, instructions
W : wordlists

See also

Elephantine papyri
List of New Testament papyri
Oxyrhynchus Papyri
Saite Oracle Papyrus

References

Sources
Miriam Lichtheim, Ancient Egyptian Literature, Vol. 1 to 3 https://www.nytimes.com/aponline/2016/07/14/world/middleeast/ap-ml-egypt-antiquities.html 

Papyrology
Papyri
Papyri